Jonathan Charles Bell (born 7 February 1974) is an Irish rugby union coach and former player. As of the 2022–23 season he is defence coach at Ulster.

Education
Bell went to school at Coleraine Academical Institution, playing rugby there. He later gained a PGCE teaching qualification.

Playing career
Bell first played for Ulster as an 18 year old. He played one season for Northampton Saints in England in 1997–98. He returned to Ulster and in 1999 was part of the Ulster team that won the Heineken Cup, putting in a man-of-the-match performance against Colomiers in the final. Internationally, Bell made his Ireland debut against  on 5 June 1994. He earned 36 caps for Ireland between 1994 and 2003, and played at two World Cups. Bell played his last game for Ireland against  on 30 August 2003. He also played for the Irish sevens team, appearing in the 1997 World Cup in Hong Kong.

Bell retired from professional rugby in 2005 following struggles with injuries.

Coaching career
Following his retirement from playing, Bell became a PE teacher, working at Campbell College in Belfast where he coached the school's rugby side.

He then became an Elite Player Development Officer for the academy of his former side Ulster, and later an assistant coach.

In 2015, Bell left Ulster to join English Premiership side Gloucester, where his former Ulster and Ireland teammate David Humphreys was Director of Rugby. He was appointed as the side's defence coach. In March 2017, Bell was appointed head coach on an interim basis for the remainder of the 2016–17 season, following the dismissal of Laurie Fisher. Till the end of season 2019-20 he was defence coach. He took over as an attack coach for Glasgow Warriors for the 2020-21 season.

On 18 May 2021, Bell returned to the Premiership with Worcester Warriors as their new defence coach from the 2021-22 season. He returned to Ulster as defence coach for the 2022–23 season.

Notes

1974 births
Living people
Alumni of Stranmillis University College
Dungannon RFC players
Ireland international rugby sevens players
Ireland international rugby union players
Irish rugby union coaches
Irish rugby union players
Loughborough Students RUFC players
Northampton Saints players
Rugby union players from Belfast
Schoolteachers from Northern Ireland
Ulster Rugby non-playing staff
Ulster Rugby players
Glasgow Warriors coaches